Regina Summer Stage is a Canadian community theatre organization established in 1984 and based in Regina, Saskatchewan, Canada.

Background
Regina Summer Stage was formed by a group of citizens with an interest in community and musical theatre who wished to provide quality amateur theatre in Regina during the summer months. Encouraged and supported by the City of Regina Arts Commission, the organization has staged at least one major production every year since 1985. The organization's inaugural production was a successful run of the Gilbert and Sullivan musical H.M.S. Pinafore. Since that first show, Regina Summer Stage has produced scores of events, including musicals, dramas, and dinner theatre. Regina Summer Stage currently stages its productions at the Regina Performing Arts Centre.

Production History

 2019: Hairspray
 2018: Chicago
 2017: Footloose
 2016: The Producers
 2015: Once Upon a Mattress
 2014: Into the Woods
 2013: Nunsense II, The Second Coming; Smokey Joe's Café
 2012: Swept Off Our Feet: Boris Karloff and the Regina Cyclone
 2011: Little Shop of Horrors
 2010: My Fair Lady
 2009: Never Say Never (fundraiser revue)
 2009: Grease
 2008: Past to Present—25 Years of Regina Summer Stage
 2008: Beauty and the Beast
 2007: Oliver!
 2007: Revue-ing the Situation II
 2006: Anne of Green Gables
 2006: An Evening of M and M's
 2005: The Wizard of Oz
 2004: Camelot
 2003: Brigadoon
 2002: Anything Goes
 2001: HMS Pinafore
 2000: The Sound of Music
 2000: One Plus One (The Little Sweep, and How He Lied to Her Husband)
 1999: Anne of Green Gables
 1998: The Music Man
 1997: Annie
 1996: A Funny Thing Happened on the Way to the Forum
 1995: Oliver!
 1995: Revue-ing the Situation
 1995: Key for Two
 1994: Oklahoma!
 1994: Lullaby of Broadway
 1994: Wife Begins at Forty
 1994: Grandpa's Twin Sister (Regina Summer Stage sponsored this Milestone Players production)
 1993: My Fair Lady
 1993: Side by Side by Sondheim
 1992: The King and I
 1992: Lie, Cheat and Genuflect
 1991: South Pacific
 1991: Never Too Late
 1990: The Pirates of Penzance
 1990: Beyond the Fringe II
 1989: Fiddler on the Roof
 1989: Harvey
 1989: Last of the Red Hot Lovers
 1988: Brigadoon
 1988: Arsenic and Old Lace
 1987: The Mikado
 1987: Charley's Aunt
 1986: Saskatoon Pie (Regina Summer Stage sponsored this Persephone Theatre production)
 1986: Beyond the Fringe
 1986: All Our Yesterdays
 1986: Godspell
 1985: H.M.S. Pinafore

External links
 Official website of Regina Summer Stage

References

Culture of Regina, Saskatchewan
Theatre companies in Saskatchewan
Tourist attractions in Regina, Saskatchewan